Lernapar is a village in the Tsaghkahovit Municipality of the Aragatsotn Province of Armenia.

Gallery

See also 
Aragatsotn Province

References 

Populated places in Aragatsotn Province